Pivovar means brewer in several Slavic languages. It is a surname and a generic name for breweries. It may refer to

Persons
Steve Pivovar (1952–2016), also known as Piv Pivovar, American sports journalist

Business
Pivovar Eggenberg, a Czech brewery 
Pivovar Kocour Varnsdorf, a Czech brewery 
Pivovar Waco, a Czech brewery

Sports
FC Pivovar Veľký Šariš, a Slovak football team

See also
Pivovarov